

Ringstead Bay, with the small village of Ringstead at the eastern end and the prominent headland of White Nothe at the western end, is located on the coast in Dorset, southern England. The area lies on the Jurassic Coast and is known for its natural environment and fossils.

Ringstead Bay has a pebble and shingle beach with some sand. This forms is intertidal zone between the low cliffs to the north and the English Channel to the south.

The Ringstead Coral Bed a geological formation exposed at Ringstead Bay, hence the name. It preserves fossils dating back to the Jurassic period.

Immediately to the east are the white chalk cliffs of White Nothe, dominating the bay. Below is Burning Cliff. It is possible to walk to the top of White Nothe and back, with views of the bay and across to the Isle of Portland. It is also possible to walk to Ringstead Bay on a circular walk from Lulworth Cove to the east, via Durdle Door and White Nothe.

Ringstead Bay also has a nudist beach that is a 20-minutes walk east of the main Ringstead beach.

Access
Ringstead Bay is accessible by way of a private road with a car park at the end near the sea and Ringstead village. There is an alternative free car park in the National Trust area further inland, with footpath access to the sea via a 15–20 minute walk.

Gallery

See also
 List of Dorset beaches
 RAF Ringstead
 Ringstead village

References

External links

Bays of Dorset
Jurassic Coast
National Trust properties in Dorset
Nude beaches